Volodymyr Oleksandrovych Shcherbyna (3 February 1935 – 19 January 2023) was a Ukrainian mathematician and politician. A member of the Democratic Party, he served in the Verkhovna Rada from 1990 to 1994.

Shcherbyna died in Kharkiv on 19 January 2023, at the age of 87.

References

1935 births
2023 deaths
Ukrainian mathematicians
First convocation members of the Verkhovna Rada
National University of Kharkiv alumni
People from Makiivka